Sun Wei (born 27 October 1992) is a Chinese fencer. He competed in the men's sabre event at the 2016 Summer Olympics.

References

External links
 

1992 births
Living people
Chinese male sabre fencers
Olympic fencers of China
Fencers at the 2016 Summer Olympics
Place of birth missing (living people)
Asian Games medalists in fencing
Fencers at the 2014 Asian Games
Asian Games bronze medalists for China
Medalists at the 2014 Asian Games
Sportspeople from Xuzhou
Fencers from Jiangsu
20th-century Chinese people
21st-century Chinese people